Woodvale is a suburb of Perth, Western Australia, located within the City of Joondalup and the City of Wanneroo.  At the 2016 census Woodvale had a population of 9,276.

Woodvale is bounded to the south by Whitfords Avenue, to the west by the Mitchell Freeway, to the north by Ocean Reef Road and to the east by Wanneroo Road. Trappers Drive runs through Woodvale, from Whitfords Avenue to Ocean Reef Road. The area within and around Woodvale was primarily rural until the late 1970s. Residential development began in 1979 and was completed by 1995 with the release of the Woodvale Waters housing estate. No farming properties remain in Woodvale.

Many immigrants have settled in Woodvale, with 21.2% of residents born in the British Isles and 3.1% born in South Africa, in both cases twice the Western Australian average and four times the Australian average.

Transport 
Woodvale is served by the 465, 466, 467, and 468 Transperth bus routes heading to either Whitfords Station or Joondalup Station. The 389 route via Wanneroo Road passes the Wanneroo Council area of Woodvale, divided by Yellagonga Wetlands. Local stations of Woodvale include Edgewater and Whitfords. Traveling to Whitfords Station is preferred by residents, as bus routes link directly to the station, unlikewhich has zero routes serving it.

Education 
Woodvale contains a secondary school, Woodvale Secondary College, which opened in 1985, and three primary schools, Woodvale (1987), North Woodvale (1990) and St Luke's Catholic Primary School (1986).

Politics
Prior to the inception of the City of Joondalup in 1998, Woodvale was part of the City of Wanneroo. In 1998 most of Woodvale was included in the City of Joondalup with a small portion between Yellagonga Regional Park and Wanneroo Road remaining within the City of Wanneroo. State and federal constituencies include the federal electorate of Moore and the state electorate of Kingsley. The federal seat is held by the centre-right Liberal Party of Australia and the state seat by the centre-left Australian Labor Party.

Notable residents
 Casey Dellacqua, tennis player and 2011 French Open mixed doubles champion. 
 Graham Edwards, retired state and federal politician

References

Suburbs of Perth, Western Australia
Suburbs of the City of Wanneroo
Suburbs in the City of Joondalup